Dame Emily Mathieson Blair,  (12 January 1890 – 25 December 1963) was a British military nurse and nursing administrator who served as Matron-in-Chief of the Princess Mary's Royal Air Force Nursing Service (1938–43), Joint War Committee (1943–47) and the British Red Cross Society (1947–53).

Early life
Emily Mathieson Blair was born on 12 January 1890 at Boghead, Lenzie, Kirkintilloch, the daughter of Mary Ann (née Croll) and Hugh Blair, a businessman and muslin manufacturer. From 1912 to 1916 she trained as a nurse at Western Infirmary, Glasgow.

Nursing career
During the First World War Blair served with the Queen Alexandra's Imperial Military Nursing Service. When the Royal Air Force was formed in 1918 she moved to the Princess Mary's Royal Air Force Nursing Service, becoming Matron-in-Chief in 1938. During the Second World War she was mentioned in despatches.

In 1943, Blair was appointed Matron-in-Chief of the Joint War Committee. When the committee was disbanded in 1947, Blair served as Matron-in-Chief of the British Red Cross Society until 1953, and was responsible for supplying trained nurses for service in hospitals and convalescent homes. She was made a Dame Commander of the Order of the British Empire on 2 June 1943, and was awarded the Florence Nightingale Medal by the International Committee of the Red Cross in 1947.

Later life
Blair retired in 1953 and remained a member of the Council of the British Red Cross until her death. She died of lung cancer on 25 December 1963 in a London nursing home.

References

 

 
 
 

1890 births
1963 deaths
Scottish military personnel
Princess Mary's Royal Air Force Nursing Service officers
Queen Alexandra's Royal Army Nursing Corps officers
Officers of the Order of St John
Dames Commander of the Order of the British Empire
Members of the Royal Red Cross
Scottish nurses
British Army personnel of World War I
Royal Air Force personnel of World War I
Royal Air Force personnel of World War II
Red Cross personnel
Florence Nightingale Medal recipients